Savalen is a lake in Innlandet country, Norway. The  lake is located along the border of the municipalities Tynset and Alvdal.

The river Sivilla, which connects the lake Savalen and the large river Glomma, is regulated and exploited by the  Savalen hydropower station.

A tourist resort is located at the northern end of the lake, with facilities for winter sports. The skating stadium is the highest elevation skating venue in Norway. This venue saw two speed skating world records set by Eric Heiden, a world record in 1,000 m in 1978 and a world record in 3,000 m speedskating in 1979. Arne Garborg's Kolbotn is located at the southern end of the lake.

See also
List of lakes in Norway

References

Tynset
Alvdal
Lakes of Innlandet
Speed skating venues in Norway